Great Guitars was a supergroup formed by jazz guitarists Charlie Byrd, Herb Ellis, and Barney Kessel in 1973.

The trio performed intermittently from 1973 and released several live albums: Great Guitars (1975), Great Guitars 2 (1976), Great Guitars at the Winery (1980), Great Guitars: Straight Tracks (1991), Return of the Great Guitars (1996), Great Guitars Concord Jazz (2005). After a stroke ended Kessel's career in 1992, Ron Escheté, Mundell Lowe, Larry Coryell, and Tal Farlow variously joined Byrd and Ellis in later concerts.

References

American jazz ensembles
Musical groups established in 1973
Jazz supergroups